Mick Dempsey (born 1941 in Waterford, Ireland) is an Irish retired sportsperson. He played hurling with his local club Mount Sion and was a member of the Waterford senior inter-county team in the 1960s.

References

1941 births
Living people
Mount Sion hurlers
Waterford inter-county hurlers